Anele Mdoda (born May 19, 1984) is a South African  television personality, presenter and Author. Born and raised in Mthatha, Eastern Cape, Mdoda obtained a degree in Politics and International Relations at the University of Pretoria, her career began at the age of 20 in 2004 as a radio DJ.

Career 
Anele Mdoda was born May 19, 1984, in Mthatha, Eastern Cape. Her Thembisa Mdoda (b. 1982) is a television personality. After her matric she enrolled at University of Pretoria Degree in Politics and International Relations. She worked  at Highveld FM after her graduation in 2007. Following year, after she left Highveld FM and she worked for 5FM. That  same year she contested on fifth season of Strictly Come Dancing reality competition.

From 2009 to 2010, Mdoda co-hosted SA's Got Talent which was aired on SABC 2 along with Rob van Vuuren.

Mdoda was announced Miss South Africa judge in 2012, that same year she became a judge of  reality competition Clash of the Choirs.

In 2013, she hosted docu-reality series Dream School SA aired on M-Net.

Tongue in Cheek talk show was co-hosted by Anele in 2014, two years  later she hosted daytime talk show Real Talk with Anele.

In May 2016, she co-hosted Our Perfect Wedding with her sister Thembisa.

In November 2018, Mdoda joined  947 as Breakfast Club show host. That same month she hosted third season of  The Voice South Africa, which airs on M-NET

In 2020, Mdoda was a judge on 2020 Miss South Africa pageant.

In February 2021, she landed on role of hosting Pan-African television show The Buzz.

In September 2021, she was announced as Miss South Africa host along with Nico Panagio.

Mdoda hosted Miss South Africa Beauty Pageant 2022 which was held at SunBet Arena on August 13, 2022.

In the second quarter of 2022, Mdoda co-produced Ludik Netflix Afrikaans series.

Achievements 
Throughout her career Mdoda has scored several locally and international accolades. In 2012, she was name Rising Star of the Year by Media Magazine. At 27th Annual Nickelodeon's Kids Choice Awards, she won Top South African Radio DJ.

Anele won Best talk Show at the 2017 Golden Horn Awards. She also won Best Breakfast Show Host at the South African  Radio Awards 2021.

Best of Joburg Awards

!
|-
|2020
| rowspan="2" | Herself
|Best radio personality
|
|
|-
|2021 
|Best Radio Personality of the Year
|
|

South African Film and Television Awards 

!
|-
|2017
|Herself 
|Best talk Show
|
|

South African Radio Awards 

!
|-
|rowspan=5|2022
|Club 947
|Breakfast show presenter
|
|rowspan=5|
|-
|rowspan=2|Herself 
|Best Breakfast Show Presenter
|
|-
|Best Promotions/Stunt
|
|-
|The Perfect Proposal
|Best Multi-Channel Promotions 
|
|-
|LottoStar Summer of Millions with 947
|Best Radio Innovation
|
|-

References

External links
 
Anele Mdoda as TVSA

1984 births
Living people
South African television presenters
South African women television presenters
University of Pretoria alumni